Bilel Herbache (born 4 January 1986) is an Algerian footballer who plays for USM Blida in the Algerian Ligue Professionnelle 2 as a midfielder.

References

External links

1986 births
Living people
Association football midfielders
Algerian footballers
JS Kabylie players
ASM Oran players
CA Bordj Bou Arréridj players
USM Annaba players
USM Blida players
USM Bel Abbès players
People from Blida
Algerian Ligue Professionnelle 1 players
Algerian Ligue 2 players
21st-century Algerian people